The 1941 All-Southwest Conference football team consists of American football players chosen by various organizations for All-Southwest Conference teams for the 1941 college football season.  The selectors for the 1941 season included the Associated Press (AP) and the United Press (UP).

The 1941 Texas A&M Aggies football team won the conference championship, was ranked No. 9 in the final AP Poll, and placed four players on the first team: back Derace Moser (AP-1, UP-1); ends James Sterling (AP-1, UP-1); tackle Martin Ruby (AP-1, UP-1); and center Bill Sibley (AP-1, UP-1).

The 1941 Texas Longhorns football team was ranked No. 4 in the final AP Poll and also placed four players on the first team: backs Jack Crain and Pete Layden (AP-1, UP-1); end Malcolm Kutner (AP-1, UP-1); and guard Chal Daniel (AP-1, UP-1).

All Southwest selections

Backs
 Pete Layden, Texas (AP-1; UP-1)
 Preston Johnston, SMU (AP-1; UP-1)
 Derace Moser, Texas A&M (AP-1; UP-1) (Southwest Conference MVP, 1941)
 Jack Crain, Texas (AP-1; UP-1)
 Jack Wilson, Baylor (AP-2, UP-2)
 Vernon Martin, Texas (AP-2, UP-2)
 Milton Crain, Baylor (AP-2, UP-2)
 Kyle Gillespie, TCU (AP-2)
 Bob Brumley, Rice (UP-2)

Ends
 James Sterling, Texas A&M (AP-1; UP-1)
 Malcolm Kutner, Texas (AP-1; UP-1) (College Football Hall of Fame)
 Bruce Alford Sr., TCU (AP-2, UP-2)
 Bill Henderson, Texas A&M (AP-2)
 Russell, Baylor (UP-2)

Tackles
 Derrell Palmer, TCU (AP-1; UP-1)
 Martin Ruby, Texas A&M (AP-1; UP-1) (College Football Hall of Fame)
 Jeff Coats, Arkansas (AP-2, UP-2)
 Julian Garrett, Texas (AP-2, UP-2)

Guards
 Chal Daniel, Texas (AP-1; UP-1)
 Art Goforth, Rice (AP-1)
 Ted Ramsey, SMU (AP-2, UP-1)
 Buddy Jungmichel, Texas (AP-2, UP-2)
 Goforth, Rice (UP-2)

Centers
 Bill Sibley, Texas A&M (AP-1; UP-1)
 Daryl Cato, Arkansas (AP-2, UP-2)

Key
AP = Associated Press

UP = United Press

Bold = Consensus first-team selection of both the AP and UP

See also
1941 College Football All-America Team

References

All-Southwest Conference
All-Southwest Conference football teams